Bocanda Department is a department of N'Zi Region in Lacs District, Ivory Coast. In 2021, its population was 121,469 and its seat is the settlement of Bocanda. The sub-prefectures of the department are Bengassou, Bocanda, Kouadioblékro, and N'Zécrézessou.

History

Bocanda Department was created in 1998 as a second-level subdivision via a split-off from Dimbokro Department. At its creation, it was part of N'Zi-Comoé Region.

In 2011, districts were introduced as new first-level subdivisions of Ivory Coast. At the same time, regions were reorganised and became second-level subdivisions and all departments were converted into third-level subdivisions. At this time, Bocanda Department became part of N'Zi Region in Lacs District.

In 2012, Kouassi-Kouassikro sub-prefecture was split from Bocanda Department and divided into two sub-prefectures to create Kouassi-Kouassikro Department.

Notes

Departments of N'Zi Region
1998 establishments in Ivory Coast
States and territories established in 1998